Ricardo Gomes Lezón Bouças (born 16 December 1994) is a Portuguese footballer who plays for Merelinense, as a defender.

Club career
On 3 January 2017, Bouças made his professional debut with Sporting Covilhã in a 2016–17 Taça da Liga match against Sporting Braga.

References

External links

Stats and profile at LPFP 

1994 births
Living people
People from Viana do Castelo
Portuguese footballers
Association football defenders
SC Vianense players
S.C. Covilhã players
S.C. Braga players
S.C. Salgueiros players
AD Oliveirense players
Merelinense F.C. players
Sportspeople from Viana do Castelo District